Pappali is a 2014 Indian Tamil-language film directed by A. Govindamoorthy. It stars Senthil Kumar and Ishaara Nair in the lead roles, while Saranya Ponvannan, Singampuli and Jagan play supporting roles. The film, which has music composed by Vijay Ebenezer, was released on 11 July 2014.

Cast
Senthil Kumar as Karthik
Ishaara Nair as Subbalakshmi
Jagan
Ilavarasu
Saranya Ponvannan
Singampuli
Aadukalam Naren
Nirosha

Production
Govindamurthy, who had previously directed Karuppusamy Kuththagaithaarar (2007) and Vedigundu Murugesan (2009), approached the producers with a script and they readily agreed to produce the venture after listening to his narration. He revealed that the team signed on Senthil Kumar and Ishara Nair to work on the film, as the team could not afford bigger stars and could not afford to wait for their dates. The songs of the film were released in March 2014.

Release
The film opened to poor reviews in July 2014, with a critic from Sify.com noting that the film "is a crude and crass comedy laced with sentiments", adding the "film lacks technical finesse and is difficult to sit through". New Indian Express wrote "The first half with its crude comedy, jarring at times, leads one to believe that the film would be a mindless comic caper. But the latter part makes up for it, taking a total about-turn" praising the message of the film.

References 

2014 films
2010s Tamil-language films
Films directed by A. Govindamoorthy